I due Figaro may refer to:

I due Figaro (Carafa), 1820 opera by Carafa and librettist Felice Romani
I due Figaro (Mercadante), 1826 setting of the same libretto, premiered Madrid 1835